Big-Hearted Bosko is a 1932 Warner Bros. Looney Tunes cartoon, featuring Bosko, the original star of the series. It was released on March 5, 1932, although one source offers for it (and other contemporary Bosko shorts) only an ambiguous release date of 1931–1932. It was, like most Looney Tunes of its time, directed by Hugh Harman; its musical direction was by Frank Marsales.

Summary
A skate-clad Bosko leaps and prances upon the ice, his dog Bruno barking rhythmically, here and there narrowly avoiding sliding into patches of yet-unfrozen water; the poor canine cannot keep up with his master forever and eventually slides into the frigid pond. The dog's howling catches Bosko's attention and, as Bruno sinks, our hero wonders aloud desperately what he should do. But the lost creature pops mockingly out of a nearby hollow log, taunting Bosko, who breaks a branch from a nearby tree and tosses it to the wind for Bruno to fetch with great enthusiasm. Coming upon the stick, Bruno is spooked by the sound and movement coming from a covered basket: running back to alert his master, the dog bumps into a young tree and is forthwith buried in snow. Undeterred, the animal continues back to the basket, now accompanied by Bosko, who warns his friend to stay back. But, finding the contents of the basket to be harmless, Bosko invites Bruno to check under its cover: a baby in a bonnet pops out, squeezing Bruno's nose when the animal comes too close. Repelled, Bruno's plight is lovingly laughed at by Bosko, who merrily orders Bruno to carry the basket home. Off skates Bosko, Bruno and baby behind; the infant cries as Bosko scats a lullaby.

Back home and by a roaring fire, Bruno rocks the baby in his cradle as Bosko plays a gentle theme on a violin. Still, the baby cries; for all Bosko's plucking and Bruno's grinning, still, the baby cries. Frustrated, the dog storms off, taking an unlucky seat upon the hot stove. Behind aflame, Bruno leaps about in anguish, quenching the fire at last with a bucket of water. At this, the whiny infant laughs! But this mirth is short-lived: the hollering springs afresh and Bosko, abandoning his fiddle, takes up a fife, intoning "The Waxies' Dargle" to Bruno's percussive accompaniment. When this avails naught, Bosko tries verbally to comfort the foundling, who complains in song. Bruno again storms off, this time to the bathroom; he slams the door, jostling a lintel-mounted cuckoo clock, which falls from its perch, hits the dog on his head, and mocks the creature's resultant daze with a timely "cuckoo! cuckoo!"

The baby cries. Bosko tickles his charge and then leaps for the piano; he intersperses his performance with shadow puppetry. Bruno reenters, happily joining the musical act by donning a lampshade as though it were a hoop skirt. Finally, the baby seems happy. Bosko dances off, skating upon a rug up to his stove, popping open the oven-door briefly to reveal a live bird in a roasting pan. Our hero skips back, finally sliding into a decorative column, knocking over a small fish bowl, which flips over upon his head to the giggles of his audience.

References

External links
 Big-Hearted Bosko on YouTube (unrestored; low quality)

Looney Tunes shorts
Warner Bros. Cartoons animated short films
1932 films
1932 animated films
Films scored by Frank Marsales
Films directed by Hugh Harman
Bosko films
Animated films about dogs
Animated films about cats
1930s Warner Bros. animated short films